John Gilbert (born John Cecil Pringle; July 10, 1897 – January 9, 1936) was an American actor, screenwriter and director. He rose to fame during the silent film era and became a popular leading man known as "The Great Lover". His breakthrough came in 1925 with his starring roles in The Merry Widow and The Big Parade. At the height of his career, Gilbert rivaled Rudolph Valentino as a box office draw.

Gilbert's career declined precipitously when silent pictures gave way to talkies. Though Gilbert was often cited as one of the high-profile examples of an actor who was unsuccessful in making the transition to sound films, his decline as a star had far more to do with studio politics and money than with the sound of his screen voice, which was rich and distinctive.

Early life and stage work
Born John Cecil Pringle in Logan, Utah, to stock-company actor parents, John George Pringle (1865–1929) and Ida Adair Apperly Gilbert (1877–1913), he struggled through a childhood of abuse and neglect, with his family moving frequently and young "Jack" having to attend assorted schools throughout the United States. When his family finally settled in California, he attended Hitchcock Military Academy in San Rafael. After he left school,  Gilbert worked as a rubber goods salesman in San Francisco, then performed with the Baker Stock Company in Portland, Oregon, in 1914. He subsequently found work the following year as a stage manager in another stock company in Spokane, Washington, but he soon lost that job when the company went out of business.

Film career
After losing his stage job in 1915, Gilbert decided to try screen acting, and he quickly gained work as a film extra through Herschell Mayall. Gilbert first appeared in The Mother Instinct (1915), a short directed by Wilfred Lucas. He then found work as an extra with the Thomas Ince Studios in productions such as The Coward (1915), Aloha Oe (1915), Civilization (1915), The Last Act (1916), and William Hart's Hell's Hinges (1916).

Kay-Bee Company
During his initial years in films, Gilbert also performed in releases by Kay-Bee Company such as Matrimony (1915), The Corner (1915), Eye of the Night (1916), and Bullets and Brown Eyes (1916). His first major costarring role was as Willie Hudson in The Apostle of Vengeance, also with William S. Hart. Viewed by studio executives as a promising but still "juvenile" actor at this stage of his career, Gilbert's contract salary was $40 a week ($ today), fairly ample pay for most American workers in the early 1900s. Gilbert continued to get more substantial parts at Kay-Bee, which billed him as "Jack Gilbert" in The Aryan (1916), The Phantom (1916), Shell 43 (1916), The Sin Ye Do (1917), The Weaker Sex (1917), and The Bride of Hate (1917). His first true leading role was in Princess of the Dark (1917) with Enid Bennett, but the film was not a big success and he went back to supporting roles in The Dark Road (1917), Happiness (1917), The Millionaire Vagrant (1917), and The Hater of Men (1917).

Triangle Films and other studios
Gilbert went over to Triangle Films where he was in The Mother Instinct (1917), Golden Rule Kate (1917), The Devil Dodger (1917) (second billed), Up or Down? (1917), and Nancy Comes Home (1918). For Paralta Plays, Gilbert did Shackled (1918), One Dollar Bid (1918), and Wedlock (1918) and More Trouble (1918) for Anderson, but the company went bankrupt. He also was cast in Doing Their Bit (1918) at Fox and then returned to Triangle for The Mask (1918). Gilbert also did Three X Gordon (1918) for Jesse Hampton, The Dawn of Understanding (1918), The White Heather (1919) for Maurice Tourneur, The Busher (1919) for Thomas Ince, The Man Beneath for Haworth, A Little Brother of the Rich (1919) for Universal, The Red Viper (1919) for Tyrad, For a Woman's Honor (1919) for Jess Hampton, Widow by Proxy (1919) for Paramount, Heart o' the Hills (1919) for Mary Pickford,  and Should a Woman Tell? (1919) for Screen Classics.

Actor, screenwriter and director for Tourneur
Maurice Tourneur signed him to a contract to both write and act in films. Gilbert performed in and co-wrote The White Circle (1920), The Great Redeemer (1921), and Deep Waters (1921). As a writer only, he worked on The Bait (1921), which starred and was produced by Hope Hampton. For Hampton, Gilbert wrote and directed as well, but he did not appear in Love's Penalty (1921).

Fox and stardom

In 1921, Gilbert signed a three-year contract with Fox Film Corporation, which subsequently cast him in romantic leading roles and promoted him now as "John Gilbert". The actor's first starring part for the studio was in Shame (1921). He followed it with leading roles in Arabian Love (1922), Gleam O'Dawn (1922), The Yellow Stain (1922), Honor First (1922), Monte Cristo (1922), Calvert's Valley (1922), The Love Gambler (1922), and A California Romance (1922). Many of the scenarios for these films were written by Jules Furthman.

Gilbert returned temporarily to Tourneur to costar with Lon Chaney in While Paris Sleeps (1923). Back at Fox, he starred in Truxton King (1923), Madness of Youth (1923), St. Elmo (1923), and The Exiles (1923). The same year he starred in Cameo Kirby (1923), directed by John Ford, co starring Jean Arthur. He went into The Wolf Man (1923) with Norma Shearer, not a horror film, but the story of a man who believes he murdered his fiancée's brother while drunk. Gilbert also performed in his last films for Fox in 1924, including Just Off Broadway, A Man's Mate, The Lone Chance, and Romance Ranch.

Metro-Goldwyn-Mayer
Under the auspices of movie producer Irving Thalberg, Gilbert obtained a release from his Fox contract and moved to MGM, where he became a full-fledged star cast in major productions. First starring in His Hour (1924) directed by King Vidor and written by Elinor Glyn his film career entered its ascendancy. He followed this success with He Who Gets Slapped (1924) co-starring Chaney and Shearer and directed by Victor Sjöström; The Snob (1924) with Shearer; The Wife of the Centaur (1924) for Vidor.

The next year, Gilbert would star in two of MGM's most critically acclaimed and popular film productions of the silent era: Erich von Stroheim's The Merry Widow and King Vidor's The Big Parade.

The Merry Widow (1925)
Gilbert was assigned to star in Erich von Stroheim's The Merry Widow by Irving Thalberg, over the objections of the Austrian-American director. Von Stroheim expressed his displeasure bluntly to his leading man: "Gilbert, I am forced to use you in my picture. I do not want you, but the decision was not in my hands. I assure you I will do everything in my power to make you comfortable." Gilbert, mortified, soon stalked off the set in a rage, tearing off his costume. Von Stroheim followed him to his dressing room and apologized. The two agreed to share a drink. Then Gilbert apologized and they had another drink. The tempest subsided and was resolved amicably. According to Gilbert, the contretemps served to "cement a relationship which for my part will never end."

The public adulation that Gilbert experienced with his growing celebrity astounded him: "Everywhere I hear whispers and gasps in acknowledgment of my presence...[t]he whole thing became too fantastic for me to comprehend. Acting, the very thing I had been fighting and ridiculing for seven years, had brought me success, riches and renown. I was a great motion picture artist. Well, I’ll be damned!"

The Big Parade (1925)
Gilbert was next cast by Thalberg to star in King Vidor's war-romance The Big Parade (1925), which became the second-highest grossing silent film and the most profitable film of the silent era.  Gilbert's  "inspired performance" as an American doughboy in France during World War I was the high point of his acting career. He fully immersed himself in the role of Jim Apperson, a Southern gentleman who, with two working class comrades, experiences the horrors of trench warfare. Gilbert declared: "No love has ever enthralled me as did the making of this picture...All that has followed is balderdash."

The following year, Vidor reunited Gilbert with two of his co-stars from that picture, Renée Adorée and Karl Dane, for the film La Bohème (1926) which also starred Lillian Gish. He then did another with Vidor, Bardelys the Magnificent (1926).

Greta Garbo
In 1926, Gilbert made Flesh and the Devil, his first film with Greta Garbo. Gilbert first encountered Garbo on the set during filming of the railway station scene, and the chemistry between the two was evidently instantaneous. Director Clarence Brown remarked approvingly that he "had a love affair going for me that you couldn’t beat, any way you tried." Garbo and Gilbert soon began a highly publicized romance, much to the delight of their fans and to MGM.

He made The Show (1927) with Adoree for Tod Browning then did Twelve Miles Out (1927) with Joan Crawford and Man, Woman and Sin (1927) with Jeanne Eagels.

Gilbert was reunited with Garbo in a modern adaptation of Tolstoy's 19th-century novel, Anna Karenina. The title was changed to Love (1927) to capitalize on the real life love affair of the stars and advertised by MGM as "Garbo and Gilbert in Love."

Though officially directed by Edmund Goulding, Gilbert, though uncredited, was responsible for directing the love scenes involving Garbo. He was perhaps the only person in the industry whose "artistic judgment" she fully respected. As such, MGM approved of this arrangement.

Gilbert made The Cossacks (1928) with Adoree; Four Walls (1928) with Crawford; Show People (1928) with Marion Davies for Vidor, in which Gilbert only had a cameo; and The Masks of the Devil (1928) for Victor Sjöström.

Gilbert and Garbo were teamed for a third time in A Woman of Affairs (1928). His last silent film was Desert Nights (1929).

Sound Era
With the coming of sound, Gilbert's vocal talents made a good first impression, though the studio had failed to conduct a voice test. The conventional wisdom of the day dictated that actors in the new talkies should emulate "correct stage diction". Gilbert's strict adherence to this method produced an affected delivery that made audiences giggle, and not due to any particularity in Gilbert's natural speech. Indeed, the "quality of his voice compared well with that of co-star Conrad Nagel, regarded as having one of the best voices for sound."

Gilbert signed an immensely lucrative multi-picture contract with MGM in 1928 that totaled $1,500,000. The terms of the agreement positioned MGM executives Irving Thalberg and Nicholas Schenck, both sympathetic to the star, to supervise his career. Gilbert, however, frequently clashed with studio head Louis B. Mayer over creative, social and financial matters. A confrontation between the two men, one that became physical, occurred at the planned double-wedding of Garbo and Gilbert and director King Vidor and actress Eleanor Boardman. Mayer reportedly made a crude remark to Gilbert about Garbo, and Gilbert reacted by knocking Mayer to the floor with his fist. While this story has been disputed or dismissed as hearsay by some historians, Vidor's bride Eleanor Boardman insisted that she actually witnessed the altercation.

In the all-star musical comedy The Hollywood Revue of 1929 (1929), Gilbert and Norma Shearer played the balcony scene from Shakespeare's Romeo and Juliet, first as written, then followed with a slang rendition of the scene. The comic effect served to "dispell the bad impression" produced by Gilbert's original "mincing" delivery.

His Glorious Night

Audiences awaited further romantic roles from Gilbert on the talking screen. The next vehicle was the Ruritanian romance His Glorious Night (1929), directed by Lionel Barrymore. According to reviewers, audiences laughed nervously at Gilbert's performance. The offense was not Gilbert's voice, but the awkward scenario along with the overly ardent love scenes. In one, Gilbert keeps kissing his leading lady, (Catherine Dale Owen), while saying "I love you" over and over again. The scene was parodied in the MGM musical Singin' in the Rain (1952) in which a preview of the fictional The Dueling Cavalier flops disastrously and again in Babylon (2022).

Director King Vidor speculated that the late Rudolph Valentino, Gilbert's main rival for romantic leads in the silent era, probably would have suffered the same fate in the talkie era had he lived. Gilbert's inept phrasing, his "dreadful enunciation" and the "inane" script as the genuine sources of his poor performance, that drew "titters" from audiences.

The "Squeaky Voice" Myth

The persistent myth that John Gilbert had a "squeaky voice" that doomed his career in sound films first emerged from his performance in 1929 with His Glorious Night. It was even rumored that Louis B. Mayer ordered Gilbert's voice to be gelded by manipulating the sound track to give it a higher, less masculine pitch. Later, after analyzing the film's sound track, British film historian Kevin Brownlow found that the timbre and frequency of Gilbert's speaking scenes in His Glorious Night were no different than in his subsequent talkies. Brownlow also reported from that analysis that Gilbert's voice, overall, was "quite low". With regard to the alleged manipulation of Gilbert's footage by Mayer or by anyone else, television technicians in the 1960s determined that the actor's voice was consistent with those of other performers on the same print, casting doubt that any targeted "sabotaging" of Gilbert's voice occurred.

Film critic John Baxter described Gilbert as having "a light speaking voice", a minor defect that both MGM and the star "magnified into an obsession." Despite any conflicting opinions or myths surrounding the actor's voice, Mayer's lingering resentment and hostility toward Gilbert remained apparent, especially after MGM's star signed a new contract for six pictures at $250,000 each. Those ill feelings fueled additional speculation that Mayer deliberately assigned Gilbert bad scripts and ineffective directors in an effort to void the contract.

Decline

Metro-Goldwyn-Mayer cast Gilbert in a film adaptation of The Living Corpse by Tolstoy re-titled  as Redemption (1929). The bleak atmosphere and maudlin dialogue presaged the disaster looming in the star's personal life and career. Gilbert's confident screen presence had vanished, while his use of the exaggerated stage diction that elicited laughs from the audience persisted. In one scene Gilbert declares ominously "I’m going to kill myself to let the whole world know what it has lost."

MGM put him in a more rugged film, Way for a Sailor (1930) with Wallace Beery. He followed it with Gentleman's Fate (1931).
Gilbert became increasingly depressed by progressively inferior films and idle stretches between productions. Despite efforts by studio executives at MGM to cancel his contract, Gilbert resolved to thwart Louis B. Mayer and see the six-picture ordeal through to the end.

Gilbert's fortunes were temporarily restored when MGM's production chief Irving Thalberg gave him two projects that were character studies, giving Gilbert an excellent showcase for his versatility. The Phantom of Paris (1931), originally intended for Lon Chaney (who died from cancer in 1930), cast Gilbert as a debonair magician and showman who is falsely accused of murder and uses his mastery of disguise to unmask the real killer.

Downstairs (1932) was based on Gilbert's original story, with the actor playing against type as a scheming, blackmailing chauffeur. The films were well received by critics and fans but failed to revive his career. In between, he appeared in West of Broadway (1931).
Shortly after making Downstairs, he married co-star Virginia Bruce; the couple divorced in 1934.

Gilbert fulfilled his contract with MGM with a perfunctory "B" picture – Fast Workers (1933) directed by Browning. He left the studio in 1933, terminating his $10,000 a week contract.

Exhausted and demoralized by his humiliations at MGM and his declining success at the box office, Gilbert began to drink heavily, contributing to his declining physical and mental health.

Queen Christina (1933)
Gilbert announced his retirement from acting and was working at Fox as an "honorary" director when, in August 1933, he announced he had signed a seven-year contract with MGM at $75–100,000 a picture. The reason was  Greta Garbo insisted that Gilbert return to MGM to play her leading man in Queen Christina (1933), directed by Rouben Mamoulian. Garbo was top-billed, with Gilbert's name beneath the title. Queen Christina, though a critical success, did not revive Gilbert's poor self-image or his career. Garbo was reported to have dropped the young Laurence Olivier scheduled to play the part, but director Rouben Mamoulian recalled that Olivier's screen tests had already eliminated him from consideration.

Columbia Pictures gave Gilbert what would be his final chance for a comeback in The Captain Hates the Sea (1934) in which he gave a capable performance as "a dissipated, bitter [and] cynical" playwright. But the off-screen cast of heavy drinkers encouraged his alcoholism. It was his last film.

Biographer Kevin Brownlow's eulogy to John Gilbert considers the destruction of both the man and his career:
"The career of John Gilbert indicates that the star, and the person playing the star, were regarded by producers as separate entities, subject to totally different attitudes. Gilbert, as an ordinary human being, had no legal right to the stardom that was the sole property of the studio. When Gilbert, as an employee, tried to seize control of the future of Gilbert the star, the studios decided to save their investment from falling into the hands of rivals, [so] they had to wreck their property. Other properties – books, films, sets – could be destroyed with impunity. But the destruction of a star carried with it the destruction of a person…it seems somewhat abhorrent that it took such tragedies as that of John Gilbert to bring us our entertainment."

Personal life
Gilbert was married four times. His first marriage, on August 26, 1918, was to Olivia Burwell, a native of Mississippi whom Gilbert had met after her family moved to California. They separated the following year and Burwell returned to Mississippi for a while. She filed for divorce in Los Angeles in 1921.

In February 1921, Gilbert announced his engagement to actress Leatrice Joy. They married in Tijuana in November 1921. As Gilbert had failed to secure a divorce from his first wife and the legality of Gilbert and Joy's Mexican marriage was questionable, the couple separated and had the marriage annulled to avoid a scandal. They remarried on March 3, 1922. The marriage was tumultuous and, in June 1923, Joy filed for legal separation after she claimed that Gilbert slapped her face after a night of heavy drinking. They reconciled several months later. In August 1924, Joy, who was pregnant with the couple's daughter, filed for divorce. Joy later said she left Gilbert after discovering he was having an affair with actress Laurette Taylor. Joy also claimed that Gilbert had conducted affairs with Barbara La Marr (with whom he had a romance before his marriage to Joy), Lila Lee and Bebe Daniels. Gilbert and Joy had a daughter, Leatrice Gilbert (later Fountain; September 4, 1924 – January 20, 2015). Joy was granted a divorce in May 1925.

In 1929, Gilbert eloped with actress Ina Claire to Las Vegas. They separated in February 1931 and divorced six months later. Gilbert's fourth and final marriage was on August 10, 1932, to actress Virginia Bruce, who had recently costarred with him on the MGM film Downstairs. The entertainment trade paper The Film Daily reported that their "quick" wedding was held in Gilbert's dressing room on the MGM lot while Bruce was working on another studio production, Kongo. Among the people attending the small ceremony were the head of MGM production Irving Thalberg, who served as Gilbert's best man; screenwriter Donald Ogden Stewart, whose wife Beatrice acted as Bruce's matron of honor; MGM art director and set designer Cedric Gibbons; and his wife, actress Dolores del Río. Bruce retired briefly from acting following the birth of their daughter Susan Ann; however, she resumed her career after her divorce from Gilbert in May 1934.

Before his death, Gilbert dated actress Marlene Dietrich from 1935 until his death in 1936 as well as Greta Garbo from 1926 to 1927. When he died, he had recently been slated to play a prominent supporting role in Dietrich's film Desire.

Death
By 1934, alcoholism had severely damaged Gilbert's health. He suffered a serious heart attack in December 1935, which left him in poor health. Gilbert suffered a second heart attack at his Bel Air home on January 9, 1936, which was fatal.

A private funeral was held on January 11 at the B.E. Mortuary in Beverly Hills. Among the mourners were Gilbert's two ex-wives, Leatrice Joy and Virginia Bruce, his two daughters, and stars Marlene Dietrich, Gary Cooper, Myrna Loy, and Raquel Torres.

Gilbert was cremated and his ashes were interred at Forest Lawn Memorial Park, Glendale in Glendale, California.

Gilbert left the bulk of his estate, valued at $363,494 (equivalent to $ million in ), to his last ex-wife Virginia Bruce and their daughter, Susan Ann. He left $10,000 to his eldest daughter Leatrice, and other amounts to friends, relatives and his servants.

For his contribution to the motion picture industry, Gilbert has a star on the Hollywood Walk of Fame at 1755 Vine Street. In 1994, he was honored with his image on a United States postage stamp designed by caricaturist Al Hirschfeld.

Filmography

In popular culture
John Gilbert is the subject of a mini-documentary film called Rediscovering John Gilbert (2010) featuring an on-camera interview with John Gilbert's daughter and biographer, Leatrice Gilbert Fountain. The short film, directed and produced by film historian Jeffrey Vance, has aired on the Turner Classic Movies cable channel and is also available on DVD from home video distributor Flicker Alley.

Fictional portrayals
Gilbert has been portrayed in several films. Barry Bostwick appeared as the actor in the television film The Silent Lovers first shown in 1980. He has also been portrayed by his grandson, John Fountain, in Sunset (1988), Christopher Renstrom in La Divina (1989), and Adnan Taletovich in Return to Babylon (2012). Gilbert was the inspiration behind the character of George Valentin, played by Jean Dujardin in The Artist (2011), and Jack Conrad, played by Brad Pitt in Babylon (2022).

Footnotes

Sources 
Baxter, John. 1970. Hollywood in the Thirties. International Film Guide Series. Paperback Library, New York. LOC Card Number 68–24003.
Baxter, John. 1976. King Vidor. Simon & Schuster, Inc. Monarch Film Studies. LOC Card Number 75–23544.
Brownlow, Kevin and Kobal, John. 1979. Hollywood: The Pioneers. Alfred A. Knopf Inc. A Borzoi Book, New York. 
Koszarski, Richard. 1983. The Man You Loved to Hate: Erich von Stroheim and Hollywood. Oxford University Press. 
Laurier, Joanne. 2011. The Artist: An amiable gimmick. The World Socialist Web Site. Retrieved May 26, 2020. https://www.wsws.org/en/articles/2012/01/arti-j07.html
Phillips, Richard. 2009. Several movies well worth revisiting: Sydney Film Festival 2009. World Socialist Web Site. Retrieved May 24, 2020.https://www.wsws.or g/en/articles/2009/07/sff5-j17.html
Reinhardt, Bernd. 2020. Rediscovering Hallelujah (1929), director King Vidor's sensitive film with all-black cast: 70th Berlin International Film Festival. World Socialist Web Site. Retrieved May 24, 2020. https://www.wsws.org/en/articles/2020/04/07/ber2-a07.html

External links

 
 
 Interview with Marlene Dietrich's daughter mentioning Gilbert
 Photographs of John Gilbert
 Sidereality review of "Gilbert and Garbo in Love" Book review/essay with considerable biographical material concerning John Gilbert
 

1897 births
1936 deaths
20th Century Studios contract players
20th-century American male actors
20th-century American male writers
Alcohol-related deaths in California
American male film actors
American male screenwriters
American male silent film actors
Burials at Forest Lawn Memorial Park (Glendale)
Film directors from Los Angeles
Film directors from Utah
Male actors from Utah
Metro-Goldwyn-Mayer contract players
People from Bel Air, Los Angeles
Screenwriters from California
Screenwriters from Utah
Writers from Logan, Utah
20th-century American screenwriters